Cuthonella elenae is a species of sea slug, an aeolid nudibranch, a marine gastropod mollusc in the family Cuthonellidae.

Distribution
This species was described from Wrangel Island, Arctic Ocean, Russia.

References

Cuthonellidae
Gastropods described in 2000